Kyle Hunter (born May 31, 1973) is a male badminton player from Canada who won a bronze medal in the 2003 Pan American Games in Men's Doubles with Mike Beres and in Men's Singles. He was born in Brantford, Ontario and grew up in the town of Paris, Ontario.

Kyle was also won the 2003 Canadian National Badminton Championships in Men's Doubles with Mike Beres.

Since 2007, Kyle has been the Executive Director for Badminton Canada.

References

1973 births
Living people
Sportspeople from Brantford
Canadian male badminton players
Badminton coaches
Badminton players at the 2003 Pan American Games
Pan American Games medalists in badminton
Pan American Games bronze medalists for Canada
Medalists at the 2003 Pan American Games